A by-election was held in the State Electoral District of Marrickville in New South Wales, Australia on 17 September 2005. The by-election was prompted by the resignation of the sitting member Deputy Premier Andrew Refshauge on 10 August 2005, in the wake of the resignation of Premier Bob Carr. The by-election was timed to coincide with two other state by-elections in Macquarie Fields and Maroubra.

The main contenders were the ALP's Carmel Tebbutt, who had been a member of the Legislative Council since 1998 and was the wife of Anthony Albanese, the member for the local federal electorate of Grayndler, and  candidate Sam Byrne, who at that time was the deputy mayor of Marrickville. The  did not stand a candidate.

Nominations for the by-election closed on 2 September 2005.

Results
Carmel Tebbutt was elected with 49.79% of the primary vote and 55.07% of the two-candidate preferred vote after preferences were distributed. However, this was a 5.63% swing to the Greens, and Sam Byrne's 38.96% primary vote was the highest for a Greens candidate in New South Wales electoral history.

Andrew Refshauge resigned.

See also
Electoral results for the district of Marrickville
List of New South Wales state by-elections

References

2005 elections in Australia
New South Wales state by-elections
2000s in New South Wales